The 1967 Iowa State Cyclones football team represented Iowa State University in the Big Eight Conference during the 1967 NCAA University Division football season. In their tenth and final year under head coach Clay Stapleton, the Cyclones compiled a 2–8 record (1–6 against conference opponents), finished in seventh place in the conference, and were outscored by opponents by a combined total of 275 to 86. They played their home games at Clyde Williams Field in Ames, Iowa.

Dave Mayberry and Don Stanley were the team captains.

Schedule

Personnel
QB John Warder

References

Iowa State
Iowa State Cyclones football seasons
Iowa State Cyclones football